Eraldo Alexandre Barros (13 August 1942 – 19 June 2016) was a Brazilian footballer who played as a forward.

Career 
Barros began his career in Brazil with Paulistano Soledade in 1960. He later played with Santa Cruz Futebol Clube, America Football Club, and EC Bahia. In 1966, he played abroad in the Primeira Divisão with Vitória de Guimarães. The following season he played with Varzim Sport Club for one season. In 1968, he played in the Segunda Divisão with G.D. Peniche. 

The following season he played in the Terceira Divisão with C.F. Esperança de Lagos, and later returned to Peniche in 1971. He had a stint with Gil Vicente F.C., and played with SC Vianense in 1973. In 1974, he played in the National Soccer League with Toronto First Portuguese. He featured in the first match of the NSL Cup final in 1976 against Toronto Panhellenic where he contributed a goal.

References 

1942 births
2016 deaths
Brazilian footballers
Brazilian expatriate footballers
Association football forwards
Santa Cruz Futebol Clube players
America Football Club (Rio de Janeiro) players
Esporte Clube Bahia players
Vitória S.C. players
Varzim S.C. players
G.D. Peniche players
Gil Vicente F.C. players
SC Vianense players
Toronto First Portuguese players
Primeira Liga players
Segunda Divisão players
Canadian National Soccer League players
Sportspeople from Campinas
Expatriate soccer players in Canada
Brazilian expatriate sportspeople in Canada
Expatriate footballers in Portugal
Brazilian expatriate sportspeople in Portugal